Sir John Stewart of Darnley, 1st Comte d'Évreux, 1st Seigneur de Concressault, 1st Seigneur d'Aubigny (1429) was a Scottish nobleman and famous military commander who served as Constable of the Scottish Army in France, supporting the French against the English during the Hundred Years War. He was a fourth cousin of King James I of Scotland (reigned 1406 to 1437), the third monarch of the House of Stewart.

Life 
The son of Sir Alexander Stewart of Darnley and Janet Keith, he was a distant cousin of the Stewart Kings of Scotland, being descended from the second son of Alexander Stewart, 4th High Steward of Scotland, Sir John Stewart of Bonkyll.

Darnley inherited his father's estates in 1404, and was knighted . In 1418 the Dauphin of France asked James I, King of Scotland, for aid against the English, requesting Darnley by name, and he left in 1419 with the expeditionary force under the Earls of Buchan (Darnley's cousin) and Wigtown. By 1420 Darnley was referred to as Constable of the Scottish Army there.

Darnley fought at the Dauphin's first victory against the English at the Battle of Baugé in 1421. He was made Seigneur of Concressault in 1421. When the Dauphin became Charles VII King of France, Darnley entered his service, and Charles rewarded him with the seigneurie (lordship) of Aubigny-sur-Nère in 1422.

Charles ordered Darnley to cross the Loire and retake  and Nevernois, and he besieged Cravant, but was defeated, captured and lost an eye. He was therefore not at the Battle of Verneuil, at which the Franco-Scottish army was heavily defeated. His ransom was reimbursed by Charles, and Darnley commanded the remaining Scots soldiers in France to form what became the Garde Écossaise, or Scottish Guards for the King of France.

Following a victory over the English at Mont Saint-Michel, Darnley was made Count of Évreux to compensate him for his expenses, and Darnley promised to relinquish it for 50,000 gold crowns. Darnley raised the siege of Montargis. Charles, unable to pay him, permitted him to quarter the Fleur-de-Lis to his coat of arms.

In 1428, he along with Renaud of Chartres, the Archbishop of Rheims, returned to Scotland to raise further troops, and to negotiate the future marriage between Princess Margaret of Scotland, and the Charles' son Louis. He returned again to France in 1429, where he took part in the Siege of Orléans where he arrived with 1000 men. Four days later, he commanded the Scottish contingent at the Battle of the Herrings, where he was killed, and his brother William, who tried to rescue him.

John Stewart of Darnley was buried in the Sainte-Croix Cathedral, Orléans.

Marriage 
Darnley married Elizabeth, a daughter of Donnchadh, Earl of Lennox . She remained in Scotland, but at some time followed Darnley to France, where she died 10 months after him and is buried beside him at Orléans. They had:

 Sir Alan Stewart of Darnley, from whom descend the Stewart Earls of Lennox, and James VI of Scotland.
 Sir John Stewart, 2nd Lord of Aubigny
 Alexander Stewart of Darnley

See also 
 Duke of Aubigny
 Duke of Richmond
 Duke of Lennox
 Earl of Lennox
 Auld Alliance

References 

 Balfour Paul, Sir James, Scots Peerage, IX vols. Edinburgh 1904.

External links 
 Scots at the Siege of Orleans (French)
 Scots Members of the French Nobility

1380s births
1429 deaths

Year of birth uncertain
Counts of Évreux
John
Scottish pre-union military personnel killed in action
People of the Hundred Years' War
14th-century Scottish people
15th-century Scottish people
15th-century peers of France